The 1936 Chicago Cubs season was the 65th season of the Chicago Cubs franchise, the 61st in the National League and the 21st at Wrigley Field. The Cubs tied with the St. Louis Cardinals for second in the National League with a record of 87–67.

Regular season 
 April 14, 1936: Billy Herman became the last National League player to have five hits on Opening Day in the 20th century.

Season standings

Record vs. opponents

Roster

Player stats

Batting

Starters by position 
Note: Pos = Position; G = Games played; AB = At bats; H = Hits; Avg. = Batting average; HR = Home runs; RBI = Runs batted in

Other batters 
Note: G = Games played; AB = At bats; H = Hits; Avg. = Batting average; HR = Home runs; RBI = Runs batted in

Pitching

Starting pitchers 
Note: G = Games pitched; IP = Innings pitched; W = Wins; L = Losses; ERA = Earned run average; SO = Strikeouts

Other pitchers 
Note: G = Games pitched; IP = Innings pitched; W = Wins; L = Losses; ERA = Earned run average; SO = Strikeouts

Relief pitchers 
Note: G = Games pitched; W = Wins; L = Losses; SV = Saves; ERA = Earned run average; SO = Strikeouts

Awards and honors

Records 
 Billy Herman, National League record, most doubles in one season by a second baseman (Herman tied his own record that he set in 1935) (57)

Farm system 

LEAGUE CHAMPIONS: Ponca City

Notes

References 
1936 Chicago Cubs season at Baseball Reference

Chicago Cubs seasons
Chicago Cubs season
Chicago Cubs